Amyas Evelyn Giles Baring (21 January 1910 – 29 August 1986), known as Giles Baring, was an English first-class cricketer between the years 1930 and 1946.

Background
A member of the Baring family of Barings Bank, Giles Baring was born Roehampton, London, 21 January 1910 the third son of Lt-Colonel the Hon. Guy Victor Baring, MP, Coldstream Guards, (1873–1916), himself the son of Alexander Baring, 4th Baron Ashburton (1835–1889), and Olive Althea Smith (1887–1964). Giles Baring's father, Colonel Guy Baring, was Member of Parliament for Winchester from 1906 until his death in action in the First World War on 15 September 1916, leaving five children. Baring had four brothers, Oliver Hugh (1904–1908), Simon Alexander Vivian (1905–1962), Aubrey George Adeane (1912–1987), and Esmond Charles (1914–1963), and one sister, Olivia Constance Leonora (1908–1975).

In 1911 the family was living at 6, Hobart Place, St George Hanover Square, Westminster.

Education
Baring was educated at West Downs School, Winchester, Gresham's School, Holt, and Magdalene College, Cambridge.

Cricketer
He represented Cambridge University in 1930 and 1931 and Hampshire between 1930 and 1939. Apart from more than fifty regular county championship games, he played in the Cambridge University v New Zealanders match of 3 June 1931, for the Gentlemen in the Gentlemen v Players matches of 2 September 1931 and 11 July 1934, for Hampshire in Hampshire v West Indians on 24 May 1933, for Hampshire in Hampshire v Australians on 23 May 1934, for Hampshire in Hampshire v South Africans on 22 May 1935, for Hampshire in Hampshire v Australians on 25 May 1938, and for H. D. G. Leveson Gowers XI v Australian Services on 7 July 1945.

He played for Marylebone Cricket Club (MCC) between 1935 and 1946, and his last first-class game was in the MCC v Cambridge University match on 29 June 1946.

Baring was a right-arm fast bowler and also a right-hand batsman. As a bowler, he took 197 wickets for 5,607 runs, an average of 28.46. As a batsman, he played 103 first-class innings, was not out 27 times and was never stumped. His average as a batsman was 8.73. A good all-rounder, he was also able to ride a unicycle.

Family
He married firstly, on 25 May 1935, Mona Montgomerie Mullins, the daughter of Colonel Willoughby Brooking Mullins of Ambersham House, Midhurst, Sussex, and they had one daughter, Claire Leonora Baring, born 29 February 1936 and died 4 August 2019, who was married to (and then divorced from) the Hon. Peter Alistair Ward (a son of the 3rd Earl of Dudley). Claire Baring then lived with the late Lord Lambton (d. 30 December 2006) at Villa Cetinale in Italy until his death, but they never married.

Baring was divorced in 1949 and married secondly Peggy Michell Gaskell, the daughter of Vice-Admiral Sir Arthur Gaskell, on 23 May 1949, but they had no children. Baring died at Newcastle upon Tyne, Northumberland, on 29 August 1986.

By his daughter, Baring had three grandchildren, the actress Rachel Ward (born 1957), the actress and environmentalist Tracy Worcester (born 1958), and Alexander Evelyn Giles Ward (born 1961), a banker and company director.

References

External links
First-Class Matches played by Giles Baring
 Giles Baring at Cricinfo England
 Giles Baring at cricketarchive.com/Hampshire

1910 births
1986 deaths
People educated at Gresham's School
People educated at West Downs School
Alumni of Magdalene College, Cambridge
Cambridge University cricketers
English cricketers
English cricketers of 1919 to 1945
Hampshire cricketers
Marylebone Cricket Club cricketers
Giles
Free Foresters cricketers
Gentlemen cricketers